Mohd Saifulnizam bin Miswan  (born 3 March 1981) is a Malaysian football player who plays as a defender for Kuala Lumpur. Saifulnizam spent nine seasons in Pahang winning domestic cups before moving to Kuala Lumpur in 2018.

Career statistics

Club

Honours

Club
Pahang
 Malaysia Cup: 2013, 2014
 Malaysia FA Cup: 2014

References

External links
 Perlu lebih kerja keras: Poyeng
 Poyeng mahu Tok Gajah menang selesa
 Pahang lebih bersemangat
 Saiful Nizam tekad benam ego PKNS
 Poyeng mahu bukti wibawa
 Pahang’s hero was Saiful Nizam Miswan

1981 births
Living people
Malaysian footballers
People from Johor
Association football defenders
Johor Darul Ta'zim F.C. players
Sri Pahang FC players
ATM FA players
Kuala Lumpur City F.C. players